Voorbeschikten  is a 1920 Dutch silent drama film directed by Tonny Stevens.

Cast
 Jan Van Ees - Jonckheer Axel van Hoogveld
 Roosje Köhler-van Gelder - Odette van der Zee
 Jan C. De Vos - Leo, een vriend van Axel
 Tonny Stevens - Lou
 Bertha de Vos-von Gentner - Colette
 Gerard Vrolik - Willem, Axels bediende

External links 
 

1920 films
Dutch silent feature films
Dutch black-and-white films
1920 drama films
Dutch drama films
Silent drama films